Alice Regnault (born Augustine-Alexandrine Toulet; February 5, 1849 – July 12, 1931) was a French actress.

Her theatrical career began in 1871, but she was praised mainly for her beauty. She became very rich as a courtesan in Paris, and retired in 1881. She briefly worked as a journalist, under the pseudonym of Mitaine de Soie, and published two novels without much attention: Mademoiselle Pomme (1886) and La Famille Carmettes (1888).

She is best known for marrying in secret the French writer Octave Mirbeau, in May 1887, in London. After his death, she published the fictitious Testament politique d’Octave Mirbeau, which was in fact written by former anti-militarist and pacifist Gustave Hervé. Sacha Guitry dramatized this "betrayal" in his 1923 comedy, Un sujet de roman, inspired by Alice and his old friend Mirbeau, whom he admired very much.

Bibliography 
 Pierre Michel, Alice Regnault, épouse Mirbeau, À l'écart, 1994.

External links 
 Alice Regnault, in  Dictionnaire Octave Mirbeau.
 Pierre Michel, « Mirbeau et l'affaire Gyp », Littératures, n° 26, spring 1992, p. 201-219.

1849 births
1931 deaths
19th-century French actresses
French stage actresses
French women writers
Octave Mirbeau